Marine Grisoul (b. 28 July 1988, Alès, France) is a Monegasque politician and the youngest member of the National Council of Monaco.

Life 
Marine Grisoul was born on 28 July 1988 in Alès, France. Having received a diploma in therapeutic education and higher technician certificate (BTS) in dietetics and nutrition, Grisoul worked as a director of a dietetics and nutrition firm in Paris. Currently she is a dietitian and nutritionist at Princess Grace Hospital Center (CHPG).

Political career 
Grisoul is a founding member and Secretary General of the political group Primo! (Priority Monaco). In 2018, Grisoul was elected a member of the National Council of Monaco from Primo! She became the youngest member of the National Council. Grisoul was elected Female Personality of the Year 2018 in the Principality.

In 2020, Grisoul reported about the bill on unconventional care practices approved by the National Council in favor of alternative medicines.

Grisoul is a member of associations “Friendships without Borders” (“Amitiés sans Frontières”) and “Fabian Boisson Literary Meetings” (“Rencontres Littéraires Fabian Boisson”).

References 

1988 births
Monegasque women in politics
Living people
Members of the National Council (Monaco)
Priorité Monaco politicians
21st-century women politicians